St Martin, Cornwall may refer to:

 St Martin-by-Looe
 St Martin-in-Meneage